Ross Taylor may refer to:

Ross Taylor (born 1984), New Zealand cricket player
Ross Taylor (Australian cricketer) (1938-1996), Australian cricketer
Ross Taylor (baseball), Negro league baseball player
Ross Taylor (geochemist) (1925–2021), New Zealand-born professor of geochemistry 
Ross Taylor (ice hockey) (1905–1984), Canadian ice hockey player
Ross Taylor (rugby league), New Zealand rugby league player

See also
John Ross Taylor (1910–1994), Canadian political activist